La Balme-de-Sillingy (literally La Balme of Sillingy) is a commune in the Haute-Savoie department in the Auvergne-Rhône-Alpes region in south-eastern France. It is located 13 km away from Annecy and is part of the inter-communal structure Communauté de communes Fier et Usses, which comprises seven communes.

Population

See also
Communes of the Haute-Savoie department

References

Communes of Haute-Savoie